Solo is an American R&B musical group from New York, New York. The original members were Robert Anderson, Darnell Chavis, Eunique Mack and Dan Stokes.

The group recorded their eponymous debut album in Minneapolis, and released it in 1995. Released on Perspective Records, the album featured production primarily by Jimmy Jam and Terry Lewis.
The album produced four singles: "Heaven", "Where Do U Want Me to Put It", "He's Not Good Enough" and "Blowin' My Mind". It was eventually certified gold.

Solo released their second album, 4 Bruthas & a Bass, in 1998. The album produced only one single, "Touch Me", which peaked at No. 59 on the Billboard Hot 100. 3.0 Rebooted Deluxe was released in 2015.

Discography

Albums

Singles

References

External links
 
 

American contemporary R&B musical groups
Musical groups from New York City
Perspective Records artists